Nehru Stadium is a multi purpose stadium in Shimoga, Karnataka. The ground is mainly used for organizing matches of football, cricket and other sports. The stadium has hosted a first-class match twice: in 1973 when Karnataka cricket team played against Andhra cricket team and again in 1979 when Karnataka cricket team played against Kerala cricket team, but since then the stadium has not hosted any cricket matches.

References

External links 
 cricketarchive
 cricinfo
 Wikimapia

Cricket grounds in Karnataka
Defunct cricket grounds in India
Monuments and memorials to Jawaharlal Nehru
Buildings and structures in Shimoga district
1973 establishments in Karnataka
Sports venues completed in 1973
20th-century architecture in India